Langholm railway station served the burgh of Langholm, Dumfries and Galloway, Scotland from 1864 to 1967 on the Border Union Railway.

History 
The station opened on 18 April 1864 by the Border Union Railway. It was originally planned to open a week earlier but problems were encountered with Byreburn Viaduct. The goods yard consisted of three sidings, one of which passed through a cattle dock and continued through a goods shed and out of the other end. After its closure to passengers on 15 June 1964, the station was still open to goods traffic, although the passenger track to the platform had been lifted. Final closure was on 18 September 1967.

References

External links 

Disused railway stations in Dumfries and Galloway
Railway stations in Great Britain opened in 1864
Railway stations in Great Britain closed in 1964
Beeching closures in Scotland
Former North British Railway stations
Langholm